Gurvich, Gurwich, Gurwitch, Gurwitsch or Gurevich is a Yiddish surname, a Russian form of the surname "Horowitz" (Гу́рвич), see the latter article about its etymology.

The surname may refer to:

Gurvich
Abram Gurvich (1897–1962), Russian chess composer.
Jose Gurvich (1927–1974), Lithuanian-Uruguayan plastic artist.
Alexander Gurwitsch (1874–1954), Russian biologist
Aleksandr Gurevich (b. 1930), Russian physicist.
Aron Gurevich (1924–2006), Russian medievalist.
Aron Gurwitsch (1901–1973), Lithuanian-American philosopher.
Georges Gurvitch (1894–1965), Russian-French sociologist.
Liubov Gurevich (1866–1940), Russian editor, translator, author, and critic.
Leib Gurwicz (1906–1982), influential Orthodox Rabbi.
Naum Gurvich, Soviet-Jewish inventor of defibrillator
Fedor Dan (born Gurvich) (1871–1949), Russian revolutionary and Menshevik.

Gurevich
Aharon Gurevich, Chief Rabbi of Russian Army.
Anatoly Gurevich Soviet espionage agent during world war two.
Boris Maksovich Gurevich (born 1931), Soviet Olympic champion wrestler
Boris Michail Gurevich (born 1937), Soviet Olympic champion wrestler
David Gurevich (b. 1951), Russian-American writer.
Dmitry Gurevich (b. 1956), Russian-American chess grandmaster.
Michelle Gurevich, Canadian singer of Russian descent.
Mikhail Gurevich (chess player) (b. 1959), Ukrainian chess grandmaster.
Mikhail Gurevich (aircraft designer) (1893–1976), Soviet aircraft designer.
Mikhail Gurevich (psychiatrist) (1878–1953), Soviet psychiatrist.
Valery Solomonovich Gurevich is Vice-chairman of Russia's Jewish Autonomous Oblast.
Yuri Gurevich, American computer scientist and mathematician.

Gurwitch
Annabelle Gurwitch (born 1961), American comedic actress
Janet Gurwitch (born 1954), founder of Gurwitch Products

Gurwitsch
Alexander Gurwitsch

See also 
 Horowitz

Jewish surnames
Yiddish-language surnames